Najaf-e Tarakomeh (also Romanized as Najaf-e Tarākomeh; also known as Najaf and Qeshlāq-e Najaf-e Tarākameh) is a village in Abish Ahmad Rural District of Abish Ahmad District, Kaleybar County, East Azerbaijan province, Iran. At the 2006 National Census, its population was 1,432 in 324 households. The following census in 2011 counted 1,430 people in 345 households. The latest census in 2016 showed a population of 1,405 people in 378 households; it was the largest village in its rural district.

References 

Kaleybar County

Populated places in East Azerbaijan Province

Populated places in Kaleybar County